The 2019–20 Tweede Divisie season was the fourth edition of the Dutch third tier since on hiatus from 1970-71 season and the 19th edition using Tweede Divisie name. Thirteen teams competed from the last season along with five promoted teams from the Derde Divisie.

At an extraordinary KNVB federation meeting on 2 October 2017, representatives of the amateur and professional football reached an agreement about the route to be taken to renew the football pyramid. Part of this agreement was that no promotion/relegation will take place between the Eerste and Tweede Divisie for the current season.

At another extraordinary KNVB federation meeting on 7 June 2018, an agreement was reached about the number of reserves teams allowed in each division as of season 2019–20. For the Tweede Divisie it will be 2 teams.

Effects of the 2020 coronavirus pandemic 
On 12 March 2020, all football leagues were suspended until 31 March as the Dutch government forbade events due to the COVID-19 pandemic in the Netherlands. On 15 March this period was extended until 6 April. Due to the decision of the Dutch government to forbid all gatherings and events until 1 June 2020, this period was even further extended.

Eventually, on 31 March 2020, the KNVB decided not to resume competitions at amateur level. They also decided, for those competitions involved, there would be no final standings, and therefore no champions, no promotions and no relegations. All teams will start next season at the same level as they did this season.

Teams

Standings 
>> As the competition was cancelled, below is the situation on 8 March 2020, the date the last matches were played. <<

Fixtures/results

References 

Tweede Divisie seasons
Tweede Divisie
Netherlands
Tweede Divisie